Hugh James Rose (1795–1838) was an English Anglican priest and theologian who served as the second Principal of King's College, London.

Life
Rose was born at Little Horsted in Sussex on 9 June 1795 and educated at Uckfield School, where his father was Master, and at Trinity College, Cambridge, where he was conferred the degree of Bachelor of Arts in 1817, but missed a fellowship. He was then President of the Cambridge Union Society for the Michaelmas term of 1817. Having been ordained to the diaconate in 1818, he was appointed to a cure in Buxted, Sussex, in 1819. He married Anne Cuyler and was priested later that year. In 1821, he was appointed to the vicarage of Horsham, Sussex.

After travelling in Germany, Rose delivered as select preacher at Cambridge, four addresses against rationalism. In 1827 he was collated to the prebend of Middleton, which he held until 1833. In 1830 he accepted the rectory of Hadleigh, Suffolk, and in 1833 that of Fairsted, Essex, and in 1835 the perpetual curacy of St Thomas's, Southwark. Rose was a high churchman, who to propagate his views in 1832 founded the British Magazine and so came into touch with the leaders of the Oxford Movement. Out of a conference at his rectory in Hadleigh, Suffolk came the Association of Friends of the Church, formed by Hurrell Froude and William Palmer.

In 1833–1834 Rose was professor of divinity at the University of Durham, a post which ill-health forced him to resign. He was appointed Principal of King's College, London, in October 1836, but was attacked by influenza, and after two years of ill-health he died in Florence, Italy, on 22 December 1838. He is buried in the English Cemetery, Florence, his name in the register given as "Ugo Giacomo Rose", his Scipio tomb having a lengthy epitaph in Latin.

Works
Rose published in 1825 as The State of the Protestant Religion in Germany. The book was severely criticized in Germany, and in England by Edward Pusey. In 1836 he became editor of the Encyclopædia Metropolitana, and he projected the New General Biographical Dictionary, a scheme carried through by his brother Henry John Rose (1800–1873).

References

Footnotes

Bibliography

   This article incorporates text from this public-domain publication.

Further reading

External links

Bibliographic directory from Project Canterbury

1795 births
1838 deaths
19th-century English Anglican priests
19th-century English Christian theologians
Academics of Durham University
Alumni of Trinity College, Cambridge
Anglo-Catholic clergy
Anglo-Catholic theologians
Deaths from influenza
English Anglican theologians
English Anglo-Catholics
English people of Scottish descent
People from Little Horsted
People educated at Uckfield School
Presidents of the Cambridge Union
Principals of King's College London
18th-century Anglican theologians
19th-century Anglican theologians
Clan Rose